The Pride of the Force is a 1925 American silent action film directed by Duke Worne and starring Tom Santschi, Gladys Hulette, and James W. Morrison.

Plot
As described in a film magazine review, Moore, a patrolman, is in line for a promotion but is denied it because, in the pursuit of a band of thieves, he stops to succor an injured child. He later learns of a crook band’s plan to rob the home of a banker and heads a raid against the marauders. As a result, he is made a sergeant. However, he is compelled to arrest his own daughter during the raid. She is accused of being a member of the band, but, in the end, her innocence is established.

Cast

References

Bibliography
 Munden, Kenneth White. The American Film Institute Catalog of Motion Pictures Produced in the United States, Part 1. University of California Press, 1997.

1925 films
1920s action films
American action films
Films directed by Duke Worne
American silent feature films
1920s English-language films
American black-and-white films
Rayart Pictures films
1920s American films
Silent action films